Qusha Qeshlaq-e Hasan (also Romanized as Qūshā Qeshlāq-e Ḩasan) is a village in Qeshlaq-e Gharbi Rural District, Aslan Duz District, Parsabad County, Ardabil Province, Iran. At the 2006 census, its population was 31, in 7 families.

References 

Towns and villages in Parsabad County